The Joint Global Change Research Institute (JGCRI) was formed in 2001 by the University of Maryland, College Park and the Pacific Northwest National Laboratory. The institute focuses on multidisciplinary approaches of climate change research to advance fundamental understanding of human and earth systems providing information that can assist management decisions for emerging global risks and opportunities.

Joint Institute staff bring decades of experience and expertise to bear in science, technology, economics, and policy. One of the strengths of the Joint Institute is a network of domestic and international collaborators that encourages the development of global and equitable solutions to the climate change problem. JGCRI brings together the intersecting interests of Pacific Northwest National Laboratory and the University of Maryland. Staff at the Joint Institute are focused on developing new opportunities to train university students in these interdisciplinary research areas:

Human-Earth System Models
Data Products
Human-Earth System Processes and Interactions
Impacts, Adaptation, and Vulnerability
Technology and Policy

In addition, the Joint Institute focuses on developing dialogues around global change issues, across disciplines and national boundaries, and among diverse socio-economic stakeholders.  

JGCRI staff are part of the Pacific Northwest National Laboratory, with Research Affiliate status at the University of Maryland.  Organizationally, the Institute falls under the Fundamental and Computational Sciences Directorate of PNNL and the Division of Research at UMD.  

Since 1990, JGCRI is responsible for close to 500 publications, which can be found at their Publication Page. 

Gerald "Gerry" Stokes was the director of the Joint Global Change Research Institute from 2000 to 2005. Anthony C. Janetos was the director from 2006 to 2013.
Ghassem R. Asrar became his successor in 2013, leading the organization until 2019, followed by Brian C. O'Neill in 2020.

References

External links
Official website
University of Maryland, College Park research centers